The Ethiopian National Defence Force Band (ENDFB) (Amharic: የኢትዮጵያ ብሔራዊ መከላከያ ባንድ) is a military band of the Ethiopian National Defense Force. It is located in the Ethiopian capital of Addis Ababa for ceremonial use by the state. It is composed of a marching band, a big band, a Corps of Drums, and a youth division.

History

Ground Forces Band 
The first permanent military band in the country took the form of the Imperial Bodyguard Band (Kibur Zebegna) of the Ethiopian Empire, being formed in 1929 under Swiss conductor Andre Nicod. It originally consisted of just over a dozen chosen slaves from Welega. It was the first African nation to implement western style military music conventions. In 1943, the Ground Force Music Department was founded upon the order of the Minister for War, Ras Abebe Aregai, after Emperor Haile Selassie return from exile in England two years prior. It initially consisted of 65 members, with Alemu Wolde Selassie and Agop Nalbandian (An ethnic Armenian, who was the brother of Arba Lijoch Fanfare bandleader Kevork Nalbandian) serving as instructors. It consisted of four sub-units:

 Marching Band
 Orchestra and Theatre
 Symphony Music
 Music Training

Notable members of the Imperial Bodyguard Band included Tilahun Gessesse and Mahmoud Ahmed.

Modern era 
It came under the direct command of the Derg in the 70s and went into its current form in 1991.  It received assistance from the British Royal Corps of Army Music, most recently between 2007-2012.

Duties 
Since its inception, the Ground Force Band, and now the ENDF Band, has been brought out to perform music on various events, such as state visits, official holidays, and state funerals. The band has itself trained the Tigray and Somali marching bands.

See also
 Military history of Ethiopia
 Music of Ethiopia
 Corps of drums
 Fanfare band

Sources

Military units and formations of Ethiopia
Military bands
Ethiopian musical groups
Military of Ethiopia